is a Japanese light novel series written by Hiroyuki Fushimi and illustrated by Takuya Fujima. The first volume was published by Kadokawa Shoten in July 2009 and eleven volumes have been released as of August 2012. A manga adaptation illustrated by Hayato Ōhashi started serialization in the June 2010 issue of Kadokawa Shoten's Monthly Shōnen Ace magazine. An anime television series adaptation animated by AIC aired in Japan from July to September 2011.

Plot
R-15 is about a boy, Taketo Akutagawa, who attends a school for geniuses: Inspiration Academy Private High School. Taketo is a genius novelist and writes erotica. Despite negative perceptions many people have of him, he aims to be at the top of his class and be recognized as the world's greatest writer.

Characters
In this series, most of the names of the characters have some connection to that particular characters' field of interest.

A genius at writing erotic fiction. He is looked down upon by most of the other students, especially the girls who consider him a pervert. He also works on the academy's newspaper as a reporter and interviewer. He often gets nosebleeds whenever he finds himself in a state of sexual arousal. As time passes by people's thoughts about him change and he attracts some admirers like Utae, Raika, and Fukune. Taketo's love interest is Fukune. The name Akutagawa can also mean "river of garbage", referring to the flood of erotic writing Taketo is producing when he is inspired.

A genius clarinetist. She is a shy girl who forms a close relationship with Taketo after he attempts to interview her and helps her in times of need. Although she knows Taketo is an author, she does not know he writes erotic fiction. Fukune is an awkward person to talk to because she doesn't reply often. Fukune has a tendency to read things aloud whenever she sees them, even repeating what she hears while asleep. Fukune's father is also a famous clarinetist. She tries her best to live up to his expectations; she constantly practices, leaving little time to go out. This changes when she's with Taketo and she seems to develop feelings for him. Her given name "Fukune" means "sound of a wind instrument".

A genius photographer. She often works with Taketo on the academy's newspaper. She likes taking photographs of Taketo during his most embarrassing moments. Because Taketo is her most useful model, she helps him in difficult situations so she can stay with him and take more photos. Raika also seems to have some kind of feelings for Taketo to the point that she doesn't mind Taketo thinking about her in a perverted way; she also stated that they're both ugly creatures and that they would make a good pair. Raika's given name is derived from Leica, a brand of cameras.

The Newspaper Circle Chief. She runs the academy's newspaper for which Taketo writes articles and Raika takes photos. She is a first-rate genius even by the standards at Inspiration Academy. She is normally seen protected by two bodyguards and wearing a latex uniform with her top open, exposing her breasts. The chief has a lot of secrets; secrets that should not be browsed by people because some things in this world should not be revealed.

A genius pop idol. She is one of the most popular girls in the academy. She is also one of the few people who does not mind Taketo's erotic writing, admiring the fact he works in a difficult genre. Utae harbors feelings for Taketo ever since he helped her overcome a problem. She tries to go on date with Taketo but failed because of her shyness that people might find out. Her name can also mean "sing with that voice".

A genius computer programmer. She looks down on Taketo the most out of all the students, often calling him a porno writer. With her skills she is able to hack into government satellites and computers. Ran's hacking abilities are so superior that she can hack anything. Ran is shown to be only interested in girls and hates Taketo, but this changes after Taketo helps rescue Fukune from Beni Botan. Her name means "wireless LAN". Musen means Wireless and Ran is as it sounds.

A genius inventor. She is a scientist who has invented several machines and devices; most of these malfunction in some capacity, usually causing Taketo problems. She is normally seen wearing a white lab coat. Her name means "building science".

A genius mathematician. He is Taketo's closest friend and the one who tries to defend Taketo's work. He often gets aroused when Taketo talks innocently during conversation. Taketo makes him calm down by getting him to recite . His name means  in Japanese.

A genius avant-garde artist. She is known for painting people's bodies and using other students as her canvases. Her family name "Beni" means "crimson"; a pigment.

Media

Light novels
The R-15 light novels are written by Hiroyuki Fushimi, with illustrations by Takuya Fujima. The first volume was published in July 2009 under Kadokawa Shoten's Kadokawa Sneaker Bunko imprint. The last volume, number eleven was published July 31, 2012.

Manga
A manga adaptation illustrated by Hayato Ōhashi began serialization in the June 2010 issue of Kadokawa Shoten's Monthly Shōnen Ace manga magazine. The first tankōbon volume was released on November 26, 2010; the fourth and last volume was released on February 22, 2012. A four-panel comic strip spin-off manga titled  and illustrated by Nenga Ninomiya began serialization in volume one of Kadokawa Shoten's 4-koma Nano Ace magazine sold on March 9, 2011. It was collected into one volume on February 22, 2012.

Anime
An anime television series adaptation animated by AIC, written by  Sumio Uetake, and directed by Munenori Nawa aired in Japan from July 10, 2011 to September 25, 2011. An OAD episode was released with the 10th novel volume on December 13, 2011.

Music
Opening Theme
Maji Yaba Mōsō LOVE by R-15 (Aya Gōda, Yurina Fukuhara, Nanami Kashiyama, Mana Komatsu)
Insert Song
Shiny Memories by Nanami Kashiyama (Episode 1, 2, 10)
Sensual Eden by Sengakuen (Episode 12)

References

External links
 Anime website July 2017 archive
 

2009 Japanese novels
2010 manga
2011 Japanese television series debuts
2011 video games
Anime and manga based on light novels
Anime International Company
Harem anime and manga
Harem video games
Japan-exclusive video games
Kadokawa Shoten manga
Kadokawa Sneaker Bunko
Kadokawa Dwango franchises
Light novels
PlayStation Portable games
PlayStation Portable-only games
Romantic comedy anime and manga
Shōnen manga
Video games developed in Japan
School life in anime and manga